Desbutal was a brand name drug by Abbott containing 5mg methamphetamine hydrochloride (Desoxyn) and 30mg pentobarbital sodium (Nembutal); a substituted amphetamine and a barbiturate combined within the same pill. It had a high abuse potential and is no longer manufactured.

Dosage forms 
Desbutal was designed as round biphasic tablets, with the two active ingredients visibly partitioned between the two faces of the tablet to control their rates of dissolution and achieve a more preferable pharmacokinetic profile. Each tablet featured a yellow half which contained an immediate-release formulation of pentobarbital sodium, and a blue half which contained a sustained-release formulation of methamphetamine hydrochloride (Desoxyn Gradumet). The three dosages of tablets that were manufactured included 5mg, 10mg, and 15mg of methamphetamine hydrochloride with 30mg, 60mg, and 90mg of pentobarbital sodium, respectively. Abuse of Desbutal often involved physical separation of these two halves by sawing with a razor or fingernails, followed by the consumption of each active ingredient independently rather than concurrently. Typically abusers would ingest the blue half containing methamphetamine for stimulation and wakefulness, followed by future ingestion of the yellow half containing pentobarbital as a hypnotic for counteracting stimulant-induced insomnia whenever sleep was desired.

Overdose 
A Desbutal overdose typically becomes life-threatening as a result of acute toxicity from pentobarbital poisoning, since the oral median lethal dose (LD50) of pentobarbital sodium is reached significantly sooner than the oral LD50 of methamphetamine hydrochloride when consumed as dosage units with the mass ratio present in Desbutal. Barbiturate overdose is a medical emergency which was treated with immediate gastric lavage, mechanical ventilation, and intermittent intravenous bolus administration of multiple different drugs, since no selective barbiturate binding site receptor antagonists were clinically available as an antidote, and dosages were dependent on individual patient response. These drugs often included picrotoxin, amiphenazole (Daptazile), bemegride (Megimide), and methamphetamine sulfate (Methedrine) in dosages sometimes exceeding 250mg over the first 24 hour period of being admitted into an intensive care unit (ICU). While a quantitative relationship between the blood levels of barbiturate derivatives and the depression of the central nervous system (CNS) had become established by researchers in 1955, they also emphasized that the accurate correlation of these factors is complicated by the presence of tolerance to the drug, intercurrent disease and senility, as well as the concurrent administration of other noxious substances.

Regulations 
Desbutal is no longer manufactured since withdrawal of its marketing approval by the Food and Drug Administration (FDA) in 1973 as part of a mass recall of all obesity combination drugs containing a CNS stimulant, often with a CNS depressant. The recall also included all existing stocks of parenteral amphetamines based on the FDA's contention that these products have such a great drug abuse potential that they cannot be used safely. Although the Bureau of Narcotics and Dangerous Drugs (BNDD) had already reduced the amphetamine aggregate production quota (APQ) for pharmaceutical manufacturers by approximately 90% throughout the prior two years, these combination drugs had rapidly grown in popularity throughout the two preceding decades. Many pharmaceutical manufacturers were vigorously competing for market shares by continuously developing new combinations and dosage formulations, and at the time of the 1973 recall, the estimated annual distribution of these pills was equivalent to 480 million dosage units of Obetrol 10mg tablets.

Medical uses 
The medical justification for these combination drugs was that the CNS stimulant elevates mood and suppresses appetite, while the CNS depressant mitigates many of the adverse effects of the CNS stimulant without simultaneously reducing its therapeutic benefits. Some psychiatrists will attempt to duplicate this effect, albeit only partially, using stimulants in conjunction with benzodiazepines such as clonazepam in patients with certain forms of refractory depression where monoamine oxidase inhibitors such as nardil or parnate would be indicated, but lacking the dangers associated with that class of medication, as maois are extremely toxic in cases of overdose or deliberate or accidental ingestion of tyramine. This combination is regarded as extremely effective by patients and practitioners alike, and retains efficacy over time when used as directed, but both drugs do carry risks of abuse and dependency. Typically the CNS stimulant within these older combination drugs was racemic amphetamine, dextroamphetamine, or methamphetamine as various single or mixed salts, and phenmetrazine hydrochloride (Preludin) was also marketed albeit less frequently. Typically the CNS depressant within these combination drugs was a single barbiturate salt, especially pentobarbital sodium and sodium amobarbital (Amytal), although meprobamate (Miltown), a minor tranquilizer, and methaqualone hydrochloride (Quaalude), a non-barbiturate sedative were also sometimes used. Some less common combination drug formulations included a CNS stimulant combined with multiple vitamins and minerals, a first generation antipsychotic (Eskatrol was popular), or a first generation antihistamine (Obocell-TF). Other formulations utilized amphetamines, barbiturates, and meprobamate for their ability to potentiate analgesia by combining them with analgesics such as phenacetin and aspirin.

See also
Amfecloral, a single molecule with a similar effect (due to metabolites).
Dexamyl, another pharmaceutical containing an amphetamine and a barbiturate.
D-IX, an experimental drug containing methamphetamine, cocaine & oxycodone.
Tuinal. an insomnia medication containing two different barbiturates.

References

External links
Nextbio molecular image of Desbutal

Substituted amphetamines
Barbiturates
Combination drugs